The 2008–09 PlusLiga was the 73rd season of the Polish Volleyball Championship, the 9th season as a professional league, the first season under the name PlusLiga organized by the Professional Volleyball League SA under the supervision of the Polish Volleyball Federation.

PGE Skra Bełchatów won their 5th title of the Polish Champions.

Regular season

|}

Playoffs
(to 3 victories)

Final standings

External links
 Official website 

PlusLiga
PlusLiga
PlusLiga
PlusLiga
PlusLiga